The Santo Domingo family is a Colombian family whose collective fortune makes them among the richest families in the Americas. They have also been known to dominate the beer market.

Santo Domingo family fortune
The Santo Domingo family fortune :
 Beatriz Dávila Santo Domingo $3.4 billion
 Alejandro Santo Domingo $2.5 billion
 Andres Santo Domingo $1.5 billion
 Vera Rechulski Santo Domingo $1 billion
 Tatiana Santo Domingo $500 million
 Julio Mario Santo Domingo III $500 million

Total .

Notable members

By birth 
 Julio Mario Santo Domingo, billionaire and former director of the Santo Domingo Group
 Julio Mario Santo Domingo Jr., Colombian-American businessman
 Tatiana Santo Domingo, member of the royal family of Monaco
 Bettina Santo Domingo, American filmmaker
 Carolina Santo Domingo, American fashion designer
 Alejandro Santo Domingo, Colombian-American businessman

By marriage 
 Lauren Santo Domingo, American fashion businesswoman
 Nieves Santo Domingo, Argentine journalist
 Lady Charlotte Santo Domingo, British socialite

References

 
Business families